The Gendarmerie Nationale and National Police of Cameroon were founded in 1928. They are  responsible for civilian law enforcement in Cameroon.

Sources
 World Police Encyclopedia, ed. by Dilip K. Das & Michael Palmiotto published by Taylor & Francis. 2004,
 World Encyclopedia of Police Forces and Correctional Systems, second edition, 2006 by Gale.
 Sullivan, Larry E. Encyclopedia of Law Enforcement. Thousand Oaks: Sage Publications, 2005.
 Cameroon - Gendarmerie Nationale - GlobalSecurity.org